This is British tennis player Fred Perry's record in the Grand Slams.

Australian Championships

French Championships

Wimbledon Championships

U.S. Championships]

References

Perry
Grand Slam (tennis)
Tennis in the United Kingdom